Peña Blanca is a small village in the municipality of Camotan, Chiquimula,  Guatemala, known for its poor population.
Another village, also named Peña Blanca in the department of Sololá , is where the organization Living on One Dollar lived for 56 days, filming much of the village life.
Much of the population of Pena Blanca must work as day laborers to earn a living.

References

Populated places in Guatemala